Vicar Hope Foundation (VHF), is a non-governmental  organization founded by Mrs. Nkechi Ikpeazu and registered in Nigeria as a not-for-profit institution.  The Foundation has Special Consultative Status with the United Nations Economic and Social Council.

Vicar Hope Foundation is involved in skill acquisition training, women empowerment, gender based violence and sickle cell disease management and counseling. It has headquarters in Umuahia, Abia State, Nigeria where it also operates a sickle cell care and diagnostics centre.

References 

Women's organizations based in Nigeria